Semiclassical may refer to:

 Semiclassical gravity, an approximation to the theory of quantum gravity
 Semiclassical model, the Rutherford–Bohr model or Bohr model, introduced by Niels Bohr in 1913
 Semiclassical physics, a theory in which one part of a system is described quantum-mechanically whereas the other is treated classically
 Beautiful music, a radio format
 Semi-classical music, a style of music of the Indian subcontinent